Dixon is a city in Scott County, Iowa, United States. The population was 202 at the time of the 2020 census.

Geography
Dixon is located at  (41.741464, −90.782891).

Demographics

2010 census
As of the census of 2010, there were 247 people, 98 households, and 67 families living in the city. The racial makeup of the city was 96.8% White, 1.2% African American, 0.8% Native American, and 1.2% from two or more races. Hispanic or Latino of any race were 0.4% of the population.

There were 98 households, of which 31.6% had children under the age of 18 living with them, 53.1% were married couples living together, 5.1% had a female householder with no husband present, 10.2% had a male householder with no wife present, and 31.6% were non-families. 21.4% of all households were made up of individuals, and 6.2% had someone living alone who was 65 years of age or older. The average household size was 2.52 and the average family size was 2.90.

The median age in the city was 36.9 years. 26.3% of residents were under the age of 18; 8.2% were between the ages of 18 and 24; 29.6% were from 25 to 44; 23.4% were from 45 to 64; and 12.6% were 65 years of age or older. The gender makeup of the city was 53.0% male and 47.0% female.

2000 census
As of the census of 2000, there were 276 people, 105 households, and 74 families living in the city. The racial makeup of the city was 98.19% White, 1.45% African American, and 0.36% from two or more races.

There were 105 households, out of which 41.9% had children under the age of 18 living with them, 59.0% were married couples living together, 7.6% had a female householder with no husband present, and 29.5% were non-families. 25.7% of all households were made up of individuals, and 8.6% had someone living alone who was 65 years of age or older. The average household size was 2.63 and the average family size was 3.12.

31.5% are under the age of 18, 7.6% from 18 to 24, 31.2% from 25 to 44, 19.9% from 45 to 64, and 9.8% who were 65 years of age or older. The median age was 33 years. For every 100 females, there were 95.7 males. For every 100 females age 18 and over, there were 98.9 males.

The median income for a household in the city was $37,292, and the median income for a family was $42,188. Males had a median income of $27,500 versus $21,875 for females. The per capita income for the city was $14,826. About 4.3% of families and 5.1% of the population were below the poverty line, including 3.6% of those under the age of eighteen and 3.0% of those 65 or over.

Education
Dixon is part of the North Scott Community School District, which spans  in northern Scott County.

References

External links

 
City-Data Comprehensive statistical data and more about Dixon

Cities in Iowa
Cities in Scott County, Iowa
Cities in the Quad Cities